Khan Muhammad Abbas Khan is a former member of Indian National Congress, a liberal reformer, Khan Mohammad Abbas Khan belonged to the democratic party, which formed a coalition with congress and served as the interim mister (sic) for industries. Later on he joined Muhammad Ali Jinnah. He was a freedom fighter as well as an active member of PML.

External links 
  Khan Mohammad Abbas Khan

Indian National Congress politicians
Pakistan Muslim League politicians